Quaglia is an Italian surname. Notable people with the surname include:

Colleen Quaglia (active 21st century), National level swimmer
Alberto Quaglia (active early 20th century), Italian soccer coach
Fernando Quaglia (active early 19th century), Italian painter of portrait miniatures
Franca Quaglia, Italian women's downhill skier
Gerolamo Quaglia (1902–1985), Italian wrestler and Olympic medalist in Greco-Roman wrestling
Giovanni Quaglia, founder of the Italian company SO.RI.MA. (Society for Maritime Recovery)
Hélio Quaglia Barbosa (1941–2008), Brazilian judge
Léonhard Quaglia, French ice hockey player at the 1920 and 1928 Winter Olympics
Marco Quaglia, Italian actor (Gasoline, The Best Day of My Life)
Martín Quaglia, husband of Colombian television actress Ana María Orozco
Massimo Quaglia, Italian film editor (The Star Maker, Malèna, La sconosciuta)
Roberto Quaglia (born 1962), Italian science fiction writer

See also
Madonna of the Quail (Italian: Madonna della Quaglia), a Gothic painting generally attributed to Pisanello

Italian-language surnames